Mosquito Creek is a  tributary of the West Branch Susquehanna River in central Pennsylvania in the United States.

Mosquito Creek joins the West Branch Susquehanna River at the township of Karthaus.

See also
List of rivers of Pennsylvania

References

Rivers of Pennsylvania
Tributaries of the West Branch Susquehanna River
Rivers of Clearfield County, Pennsylvania